NGC 3506 is a spiral galaxy in the constellation Leo. It is located at a distance of circa 300 million light years from Earth, which, given its apparent dimensions, means that NGC 3506 is about 115,000 light years across. The galaxy has two main spiral arms, with high surface brightness, which can be traced for half a revolution before they fade. One arm splits into four spiral arcs.

Two supernovae have been observed in NGC 3506, SN 2003L (type Ic) and SN 2017dfq (type Ia, mag. 15.3). SN 2003L spectrum featured a relatively blue continuum, dominated by strong P-Cyg lines of Ca II (H and K) and Fe II and a relatively weaker Si II 635.5-nm line was also visible.

It is an isolated galaxy.

Gallery

References

External links 
 

Spiral galaxies
Leo (constellation)
3506
06120
33379